Jason Jung (born 15 June 1989) is an American-born professional tennis player who represents Taiwan. He is a University of Michigan alumnus who has cracked the Top 150 in the ATP rankings and also won four ATP Challenger events.

Personal life
Jung played college tennis at the University of Michigan, where he majored in political science. As a tennis player, he was the National and Midwest Regional winner of the ITA/Arthur Ashe Award for Leadership & Sportsmanship in 2010, made the All Big Ten team as a junior and senior, and is 4th all-time in Michigan history in career doubles wins.

He blogs about his experiences and his life as a professional tennis player. He was featured in an article by ESPN's Grantland (along with fellow Michigan alum Evan King and up-and-coming players Frances Tiafoe and William Blumberg) that highlighted the struggles and low prize money in playing on the ITF Futures Tour.

Career
Jung's reached his first quarterfinal at the 2018 Hall of Fame Tennis Championships in Newport, Rhode Island. He defeated veteran Nicolas Mahut in the second round, but his run was ended by Tim Smyczek, who outlasted Jung 6–1, 5–7, 6–4 in a nearly two-hour, 185-point quarterfinal match.

His career-best result is a semifinal berth at the 2020 New York Open, where he defeated former world number 5 Kevin Anderson in the first round, followed by 7th seed Cameron Norrie in the second before upsetting defending champion and 3rd seed Reilly Opelka in the quarterfinals. He was eliminated in the semifinals by Italian veteran Andreas Seppi in straight sets.

ATP Challenger and ITF Futures finals

Singles: 18 (7–11)

Doubles: 12 (9–3)

Performance timeline

Singles

References

External links 
 
 
 

1989 births
Living people
Taiwanese male tennis players
American male tennis players
American sportspeople of Taiwanese descent
Sportspeople from Torrance, California
University of Michigan College of Literature, Science, and the Arts alumni
Michigan Wolverines men's tennis players
Universiade medalists in tennis
Tennis players at the 2018 Asian Games
Universiade gold medalists for Chinese Taipei
Tennis people from California
Asian Games competitors for Chinese Taipei
Medalists at the 2017 Summer Universiade